Dekadens (English: Decadence) is the fourth release by Swedish metal band Lifelover, which was released on 10 October 2009 by Osmose (MCD) and Elitmusik (MLP)

Dekadens is also the band's only release with a human drummer, which is in opposition to the use of drum machines on every other Lifelover release.

Track listing

Personnel

Lifelover
 – lead vocals
 B – vocals, guitar, piano
 H. – guitar
 Fix – bass
 Non – drums

Production
 Lifelover – pictures, layout
 B – mixing
 Gok – mastering
 Henrik Jonsson (R.I.P.) – band photography

Lifelover albums
2008 EPs
Osmose Productions EPs